Borcherding is a German language surname. It stems from the male given name Burchard – and may refer to:
Anthony Borcherding (1974), American professional wrestler
Horst Borcherding (1930–2015), German footballer
Kate Borcherding (1960), American artist working in mixed media
Kurt Borcherding (1967), retired American rower
Thomas Borcherding (1939–2014), American economist

References

German-language surnames
Surnames from given names